Kenas-e Sofla (also Romanized as Kenās-e Soflá and Kannās-e Soflá; also known as Kannās, Kenās-e Pā’īn, and Ūjan) is a village in Hasanabad Rural District, Hasanabad District, Eqlid County, Fars Province, Iran. At the 2006 census, its population was 350, in 71 families.

References 

Populated places in Eqlid County